Patric Nyambariro-Nhauro (born 1 August 1957) is a Zimbabwean long-distance runner. He competed in the marathon at the 1984 Summer Olympics.

References

1957 births
Living people
Athletes (track and field) at the 1984 Summer Olympics
Zimbabwean male long-distance runners
Zimbabwean male marathon runners
Olympic athletes of Zimbabwe
Place of birth missing (living people)